Clark Street may refer to:
 Clark Street (Chicago)
 Clark Street (IRT Broadway – Seventh Avenue Line), a New York City Subway station
 Clark-Tillary Streets (BMT Fulton Street Line), a demolished station